The 1991 Sokoto State gubernatorial election occurred on December 14, 1991. NRC candidate Yahaya Abdulkarim won the election, defeating SDP Zuberu Maigari.

Conduct
The gubernatorial election was conducted using an open ballot system. Primaries for the two parties to select their flag bearers were conducted on October 19, 1991.

The election occurred on December 14, 1991. NRC candidate Yahaya Abdulkarim won the election, defeating SDP Zuberu Maigari. Yahaya Abdulkarim polled 485,889 votes, while Zuberu Maigari polled 101,729 votes.

References 

Gubernatorial election 1991

1991
Sok